Francis Gerard Slay (born March 18, 1955) is an American politician and lawyer who served as the 45th Mayor of St. Louis, Missouri from 2001 to 2017. The first mayor of the city of St. Louis to be elected to the office four consecutive times, Slay is the longest-serving mayor in St. Louis history. He is a member of the Democratic Party.

Education and early career
Slay graduated from St. Mary's High School in 1973. He received a degree in political science from Quincy University and a J.D. degree from Saint Louis University School of Law. After graduating from law school, Slay served as a law clerk for Judge Paul J. Simon of the Missouri Court of Appeals for the Eastern District. In 1981, he joined the law firm of Guilfoil, Petzall, and Shoemake where he specialized in business law and commercial litigation. Slay was elected to the St. Louis Board of Aldermen in 1985, representing the 23rd ward. In 1995, he was elected President of the Board of Aldermen, and in 1999 was re-elected without opposition.

Term as mayor

Slay defeated incumbent mayor Clarence Harmon and former mayor Freeman Bosley Jr. in the Democratic Primary in 2001. During his first term, he oversaw significant residential redevelopment within the city, including the redevelopment of the Washington Avenue Loft District. Slay then negotiated the construction of Busch Stadium, the new St. Louis Cardinals baseball stadium in downtown St. Louis, and the re-districting of aldermanic wards required after the 2000 census. The Slay administration and its public and private partners have received national and international recognition for St. Louis's renaissance. In May 2007, Downtown St. Louis's revitalization was the subject of a Preserve America Presidential Award, the nation's highest award for historic preservation. In 2011, Citygarden won the Urban Land Institute's prestigious Amanda Burden Urban Open Space award.

Post-mayor
Slay accepted a job as an attorney with the Spencer Fane law firm, at their office in downtown St. Louis prior to his term ending on April 18, 2017

Family
Slay is the second of eleven children. His father, Francis R. Slay, was affiliated with St. Raymond's Maronite Catholic Cathedral in St. Louis, and was the long-time Democratic Committeeman in the 23rd Ward, and who once served as Recorder of Deeds. Francis R. Slay died on March 16, 2011, aged 83.

Slay and his wife Kim have two children and three rescued dogs. Slay is a Maronite Catholic and also a supporter of the Archdiocese of St. Louis and of Catholic organizations in the city. He is of Lebanese and Polish ancestry.

See also
2001 St. Louis mayoral election
2005 St. Louis mayoral election
2009 St. Louis mayoral election
2013 St. Louis mayoral election
Timeline of St. Louis

References

External links

The mayor's page on the city of St. Louis website

1955 births
Living people
21st-century American politicians
American Maronites
American politicians of Lebanese descent
American politicians of Polish descent
Mayors of St. Louis
Members of the St. Louis Board of Aldermen
Missouri Democrats
Missouri lawyers
Quincy University alumni
Saint Louis University School of Law alumni